Omorgus quadrinodosus is a species of hide beetle in the subfamily Omorginae.

References

quadrinodosus
Beetles described in 1954